Reinhardt is a German, Austrian, Danish, and to a lesser extent Norwegian surname (from Germanic ragin, counsel, and hart, strong), and a spelling variant of Reinhard.

Geographical distribution
As of 2014, 63.6% of all known bearers of the surname Reinhardt were residents of Germany (frequency 1:1,788), 24.6% of the United States (1:20,797), 1.8% of France (1:51,081), 1.6% of Canada (1:32,138), 1,6% of Brazil (1:185,079) and 1.0% of Switzerland (1:11,406).

In Germany, the frequency of the surname was higher than national average (1:1,788) in the following regions:
 1. Thuringia (1:433)
 2. Saxony-Anhalt (1:685)
 3. Hesse (1:1,096)
 4. Saxony (1:1,133)
 5. Baden-Württemberg (1:1,543)

Surname

A

Ad Reinhardt (1913–1967), American abstract painter
Alfred E. Reinhardt (1902-1987), American architect
Alfred-Hermann Reinhardt (1897-1973), German general
Alois Reinhardt (born 1961), German footballer
Althea Reinhardt (born 1996), Danish handball player
Arthur Reinhardt (1893-1973), German actor
Augustus M. Reinhardt (1842–1923), founder of Reinhardt University in Georgia, US

B

Babik Reinhardt (1944–2001), European jazz guitarist
Bastian Reinhardt (born 1975), German footballer
Benno Reinhardt (1819–1852), German anatomist
Burt Reinhardt (1920–2011), American journalist and news corporation executive

C

Carl Reinhardt (1818–1877), German author, painter, and caricaturist

D

Django Reinhardt (1910–1953), European jazz guitarist
Dominik Reinhardt (born 1984), German footballer
Doug Reinhardt (born 1985), American minor league baseball player and television personality

E

Ernst-Johann Reinhardt (born 1955), real name of German drag performer "Lilo Wanders"

F

Fritz Reinhardt (1895–1969), German Nazi leader and state secretary of finance

G

G. Frederick Reinhardt (1911–1971), American diplomat
Georg-Hans Reinhardt (1887–1963), German general
Gerhard Reinhardt (1916–1989), East German Communist politician
Gottfried Reinhardt (1911–1994), Austrian film director

H

Heinrich Reinhardt (1903–1990), also called Enrique Reinhardt, German-Argentine chess master
Heinrich Reinhardt (composer) (1865–1922), Austrian composer

J

Jamila Reinhardt (born 1989), American rugby player
Janin Reinhardt (born 1981), German television personality
Johan Reinhardt (1778–1845), Danish zoologist
Johann Franz Reinhardt (1713 or 1714 –1761), Austrian violinist
Johann Georg Reinhardt (1676–1742), Austrian composer
Johannes Theodor Reinhardt (1816–1882), Danish zoologist
John Reinhardt (born 1920), American diplomat
Joseph Reinhardt (1912–1982), European jazz guitarist
Joseph Franz Reinhardt (1684 or 1685 – 1727), Austrian violinist
Julius Reinhardt (footballer) (born 1988), German footballer

K

Karl Reinhardt (mathematician) (1895–1941), German mathematician
Karl Reinhardt (philologist) (1886–1958), German philologist
Karl Mathias Reinhardt (1684 or 1685–1727), Austrian organist and composer
Kilian Reinhardt (1653 or 1654–1729), Austrian 'Konzertmeister' to the court of Charles VI, Holy Roman Emperor
Klaus Reinhardt (born 1941), German general
Knut Reinhardt (born 1968), German footballer

L

Larry "Rhino" Reinhardt (1948–2012), American rock guitarist in Iron Butterfly and Captain Beyond

M

Max Reinhardt (1873–1943), Austrian film director
Max Reinhardt (publisher) (1915–2002), British publisher
Michael Reinhardt (born 1938), American photographer
Mimi Reinhardt (1915–2022), Austrian secretary, who worked for Oskar Schindler

N

Nicole Reinhardt (born 1986), German Olympic Gold Medalist and photo model (canoe/kayak)

R

Ray Reinhardt (born 1930), American actor
Richard Reinhardt (born 1957), real name of Richie Ramone, American punk musician
Rolf Reinhardt (1927–2006), German pianist, conductor, and music scholar

S
Sergio Reinhardt-Italian/German skateboarder
Sandra Reinhardt (born 1967), alternate name of American actress Sandra Dee Robinson
Stephen Reinhardt (1931-2018), United States Court of Appeals judge
Sybille Reinhardt (born 1957), German Olympic Gold Medalist (crew)

T

Tobias Reinhardt (born 1971), German classical scholar

W

Walter Reinhardt Sombre (1725–1778),  German adventurer and mercenary in India (known as "Sombre", "The Shadow")
Walther Reinhardt (1872–1930), German general
Wolfgang Reinhardt (producer) (1908–1979), German screenwriter and film producer
Wolfgang Reinhardt (athlete) (born 1943), German Olympic pole vaulter

See also 
Reinhard
Reinhart

References

Germanic-language surnames
German-language surnames
Surnames from given names